The Indian paradise flycatcher (Terpsiphone paradisi) is a medium-sized passerine bird native to Asia, where it is widely distributed. As the global population is considered stable, it has been listed as Least Concern on the IUCN Red List since 2004. It is native to the Indian subcontinent, Central Asia and Myanmar.

Males have elongated central tail feathers, and a black and rufous plumage in some populations, while others have white plumage. Females are short-tailed with rufous wings and a black head. Indian paradise flycatchers feed on insects, which they capture in the air often below a densely canopied tree.

Taxonomy
Corvus paradisi was the scientific name proposed by Linnaeus in 1758. 
Paradise-flycatchers used to be classified with the Old World flycatcher family Muscicapidae, but are now placed in the family Monarchidae together with monarch flycatchers.

Until 2015, the Indian paradise flycatcher, Blyth's paradise flycatcher, and the Amur paradise flycatcher were all considered conspecific, and together called Asian paradise flycatcher.

Subspecies

Linnaeus thought that the Indian paradise flycatcher occurred only in India. Later ornithologists observed it also in other areas and described several subspecies based on differences in plumage of males. Three subspecies] are recognized:
 T. p. paradisi (Linnaeus, 1758) breeds in central and southern India, central Bangladesh and south-western Myanmar; populations occurring in Sri Lanka in the winter season are non-breeding.
 Himalayan paradise flycatcher (T. p. leucogaster) (Swainson, 1838) was initially described as a separate species. It breeds in the western Tian Shan, in Afghanistan, in northern Pakistan, in northwestern and central India, and in western and central Nepal; populations in eastern Pakistan and in southern India migrate towards the foothills of the Himalayas in spring for breeding.
 Ceylon paradise flycatcher (T. p. ceylonensis) (Zarudny & Harms, 1912) occurs in Sri Lanka.

Description

Their heads are glossy black with a black crown and crest, their black bill round and sturdy, their eyes black. Female are rufous on the back with a greyish throat and underparts. Young males look very much like females but have a black throat and blue-ringed eyes.

Young males are rufous and have short tails. They acquire long tails in their second or third year. Adult males are either predominantly bright rufous above or predominantly white. Some specimens show some degree of intermediacy between rufous and white. Long-tailed rufous birds are generally devoid of shaft streaks on the wing and tail feathers, while in white birds the shaft streaks, and sometimes the edges of the wing and tail feathers are black.

In the early 1960s, 680 long-tailed males were examined that are contained in collections of the British Museum of Natural History, Chicago Natural History Museum, Peabody Museum, Carnegie Museum, American Museum of Natural History, United States National Museum and Royal Ontario Museum. The specimens came from almost the entire range of the species, though some areas were poorly represented. The relative frequency of the rufous and white plumage types varies geographically. Rufous birds are rare in the extreme southeastern part of the species' range. Throughout the Indian area and, to a lesser extent, in China, asymmetrically patterned intermediates occur. Intermediates are rare or absent throughout the rest of the range of the species. In general, long-tailed males are
 predominantly rufous with some white in wings and tail — collected in Turkestan, Kashmir, northern India, Punjab, Maharashtra, Sikkim and in Sri Lanka;
 predominantly rufous with some white in wings — collected in Iran, Afghanistan, Baluchistan, Punjab, Kashmir, northern and central India, Rajasthan, Maharashtra, Bihar, Nepal;
 predominantly rufous with some white in tail — collected in Punjab, northern and central India, Kolkata, Sri Lanka and in the Upper Yangtze Valley in China;
 predominantly white with some rufous in tail and wings — collected in Kashmir, Maharashtra, Sichuan and North China;
 predominantly white with some rufous in tail — collected in Maharashtra and Fuzhou, China;
 predominantly white with back partly rufous — collected in Punjab and Chennai;
 moulting from rufous into white plumage — collected in North Bihar.
Possible interpretations of this phenomenon are : males may be polymorphic for rufous and white plumage colour; rufous birds may be sub-adults; and there may even be two sympatric species distinguishable only in the male.

Distribution and habitat

The Indian paradise flycatcher is a migratory bird and spends the winter season in tropical Asia. In southern India and Sri Lanka specialy highlands of Sri Lanka and Western Part of Sri Lanka, both locally breeding populations and visiting migrants occur in winter.

Behaviour and ecology

Indian paradise flycatcher's breeding season lasts from May to July. Being socially monogamous both male and female take part in nest-building, incubation, brooding and feeding of the young. The incubation period lasts 14 to 16 days and the nestling period 9 to 12 days. The nest is sometimes built in the vicinity of a breeding pair of drongos, which keep predators away.The female lays up to four eggs in a neat cup nest made with twigs and spider webs on the end of a low branch. Chicks hatch in about 21 to 23 days. A case of interspecific feeding has been noted with paradise flycatcher chicks fed by Oriental white-eyes.

In culture
This bird is mentioned in Satyajit Ray's Feluda detective stories Chinnamastar Abhishap and Jahangirer Swarnamudra.

Selected photos

References

Further reading

 Lewis, W.A.S. (1942) The Asian Paradise Flycatcher Tchitrea paradisi paradisi (Linn.). Some notes on a colony breeding near Calcutta. Journal of the Bengal Natural History Society 17 (1): 1–8.
 Inglis, C.M. (1942) The Asian Paradise Flycatcher Tchitrea paradisi paradisi (Linn.). Journal of the Bengal Natural History Society 17 (2): 50–52.

External links

 The Internet Bird Collection : Asian Paradise-flycatcher (Terpsiphone paradisi)
2015 eBird India Taxonomic re-classification of Asian Paradise Flycatcher

Indian paradise flycatcher
Birds of East Asia
Birds of South Asia
Birds of Southeast Asia
Indian paradise flycatcher
Indian paradise flycatcher
Symbols of Madhya Pradesh